"It's a Small World" (stylized in all lowercase) is a water-based boat ride located in the Fantasyland area at various Disney theme parks worldwide, including Disneyland Park in Anaheim, California; Magic Kingdom at Walt Disney World Resort in Bay Lake, Florida; Tokyo Disneyland, Disneyland Paris; and Hong Kong Disneyland, with its inaugural version having premiered at the 1964 New York World's Fair before permanently moving to Disneyland.

The ride features over 300 audio-animatronic dolls in traditional costumes from cultures around the world, frolicking in a spirit of international unity, and singing the attraction's title song, which has a theme of global peace. According to Time.com, the Sherman Brothers' song "It's A Small World" is the most publicly performed song of all time.  In recent years, the Small World attractions at the various Disney parks have been updated to include depictions of Disney characters, albeit in a design compatible with the original 1960s design of Mary Blair, alongside the original characters. Countries in the Disneyland version include: The North Pole, Norway, Canada, Sweden, Denmark, England, Wales, France, Spain, Scotland, Ireland, The Netherlands, Belgium, Italy, Switzerland, Germany, Russia, Greece, Israel, Saudi Arabia, Pakistan, Afghanistan, India, Indonesia, Thailand, China, North Korea, South Korea, Japan, Egypt, Uganda, Kenya, Chile, Argentina, Peru, Ecuador, Colombia, Venezuela, Brazil, Mexico, New Zealand, Philippines, Hawaii (United States), Australia, Tahiti, Papua New Guinea, and the United States.

History
Fabricated at the Walt Disney Studios in Burbank as Children of the World, it was created by WED Enterprises, then shipped to the 1964 New York World's Fair's UNICEF pavilion, sponsored by Pepsi, where it featured at its entrance a kinetic sculpture, The Tower of the Four Winds, a 120-foot perpetually spinning mobile created by WED designer Rolly Crump. It was added to four attractions — Magic Skyway (Ford), Great Moments with Mr. Lincoln (Illinois), The Carousel of Progress (General Electric), and CircleVision 360 (Kodak)—already under development, which were used by Disney to sponsor, fund, and test concepts and develop ride systems and innovative entertainment intended to be moved and rebuilt at Disneyland after the World's Fair closed in 1966.

Mary Blair was responsible for the attraction's whimsical design and color styling. Blair had been an art director on several Disney animated features, including Cinderella, Alice In Wonderland, and Peter Pan. Like many Disneyland attractions, scenes and characters were designed by Marc Davis, while his wife, Alice Davis, designed the costumes for the dolls. Rolly Crump designed the toys and other supplemental figures on display. The animated dolls were designed and sculpted by Blaine Gibson. Walt was personally involved with Gibson's and Greg S. Marinello development of the dolls' facial designs; each animated doll face is completely identical in shape.

Arrow Development was deeply involved in the design of the passenger-carrying boats and propulsion system of the attraction. Two patents that were filed by Arrow Development staff and assigned to The Walt Disney Company illustrate passenger boats and vehicle guidance systems with features very similar to those later utilized on the Disneyland installation of the attraction. The firm is credited with manufacturing the Disneyland installation.

Song
"Children of the World" was the working title of the attraction. Its tentative soundtrack, which can be heard on the album, featured the national anthems of each country represented throughout the ride all playing all at once, which resulted in a disharmonic cacophony. Walt conducted a walk-through of the attraction scale model with his staff songwriters Robert B. and Richard M. Sherman, saying, "I need one song that can be easily translated into many languages and be played as a round." The Sherman brothers then wrote "It's a Small World (After All)" in the wake of the 1962 Cuban Missile Crisis, which influenced the song's message of peace and brotherhood. When they first presented it to Walt, they played it as a slow ballad. Walt requested something more cheerful, so they sped up the tempo and sang in counterpoint. Walt was so delighted with the final result that he renamed the attraction "It's a Small World" after the Sherman Brothers' song.

Robert J. Sherman, youngest son of Robert B. Sherman, has said that this song is the single most-performed and most-translated piece of music. In 2014, it was estimated that the song had played nearly 50 million times worldwide on the attractions alone, beating the radio and TV estimates for "You've Lost That Lovin' Feelin' " and "Yesterday", which were believed to have been played at least eight and seven million times respectively.

A third verse celebrating the attraction's 50th anniversary was written and popularized, but not incorporated into the ride.

In 2022, a 1964 recording of "It's a Small World (After All)" performed by the Disneyland Boys Choir was selected by the Library of Congress for preservation in the United States National Recording Registry as being "culturally, historically, or aesthetically significant".

Global installations

1964 New York World's Fair

The first incarnation of It's a Small World, which debuted at the 1964 New York World's Fair, was an afterthought and nearly did not happen. Ford and General Electric had engaged Disney early on to create their pavilions for the 1964 New York World's Fair. WED Enterprises had already long been at work developing a "dancing-doll" designed to reproduce human movement resulting in a crude early audio-animatronics fashioned as Abraham Lincoln when the State of Illinois approached Disney to create the Illinois Pavilion, representatives of the state instantly approved after being "introduced" to the robotic figurehead. A nine wide-screen CircleVision 360° exhibit for Kodak's pavilion was also being planned as an improvement over the existing Disneyland eleven 4:3 format screen Circarama (which later failed the installation deadline for opening) when Pepsi approached Disney with a plan to tribute UNICEF.
Disney seemed to be the showman to give us the package we want ... He's terrific. He's got his hands in more bowls than anyone I've ever seen, but he accomplishes what he sets out to do. — J. G. Mullaly, Ford's World's Fair program manager

April 22, 1964 – opening day
A salute to the children of the world, designed by Walt Disney, presents animated figures frolicking in miniature settings of many lands. Visitors are carried past the scenes in small boats. In an adjoining building Pepsi sponsors exhibits by the U.S. Committee for the United Nations Children's Fund. Above the pavilion rises the 120-foot Tower of the Four Winds, a fanciful creation of coloured shapes that dance and twist in the breeze. – 1965 Official Guide Book to the New York World's Fair

The attraction was incredibly successful. Ten million 60¢ and 95¢ tickets for children and adults, respectively, were collected in two half-year seasons and the proceeds were donated to UNICEF. While other attractions had lines out the doors, there seemed to always be a seat available aboard It's a Small World. Its high rider-per-hour capacity was recognized as a valuable innovation and was incorporated indirectly and directly into future attractions. Pirates of the Caribbean had been under construction at Disneyland as a subterranean walk-through. That design was scrapped as concrete was broken out so similar boats could sail past scenes which (because the original walk-through scene length was not shortened) were now different each voyage, another concept which forever influenced attraction design and popularity.

Disneyland
The boats enter the show building through a tunnel under the Small World clock and emerge from the attraction fifteen minutes later. The show building interior is larger than the façade. Voyagers see animatronic dolls in traditional local costumes singing "It's a Small World (After All)" together, each in their native language. Boats carry voyagers as they visit the regions of the world.

Other Disney park installations wind the flume around one large room, emphasizing its theme that the world is small and interconnected. Each installation may vary the countries which are represented and the order in which they appear. The boats are stored behind the facade and go in and out backstage in between the Spanish room.

The ride was originally sponsored by Bank of America from when it opened until 1990. The ride was then sponsored by Mattel from 1992 to 1999.

Exterior
The Tower of the Four Winds was not relocated to Disneyland's It's a Small World after the New York World's Fair; in its place is an outdoor oval flume and boarding queue decorated with topiary backed by a large, flat facade with stylized cutout turrets, towers and minarets which are vaguely reminiscent of world landmarks (such as the Eiffel Tower and the Leaning Tower of Pisa). The facade was designed by Disney Imagineer Rolly Crump, who was inspired by Mary Blair's styling. Walt Disney asked Rolly to design a large 30-foot clock, a central feature of the exterior façade, with a smiling face that rocks back and forth to a ticking sound.

A parade of wooden dolls in native culture costumes dance out from doors at the base of the Small World clock to an instrumental toy soldier version of "It's a Small World (After All)" in preparation for each quarter-hour, reminiscent of a European automaton clock. As the last doll returns into the clock, the parade doors close and the large central pair of doors open to reveal two giant toy blocks – the large block displays stylized numerals of the hour, the small one displays the minutes, while large and small bells toll to count the hours and quarters.

The exterior has been subtly repainted over the years, first as all-white with a gold/silver trim (1966), then in various shades of blue (1977), then in pink and white with pastel accents (1992). Portions of the left side of the original façade were removed in 1991 to make room for the entrance to Mickey's Toontown. As of 2020, the facade is white with a gold trim as it was in 1966, except the original gold and silver paint of the clock, the smiling clock face is now entirely gold leaf. The façade was repainted back to its original color scheme in 2002. The gardens around the building are decorated with topiary animals.

During the 2005–2006 holiday season, an elaborate multimedia presentation was projected on the outdoor façade which registered colored patterns matched to the façade each quarter-hour after dusk. Guests were encouraged to view the popular Remember... Dreams Come True fireworks presentation from the It's a Small World Mall and nearby parade viewing platform built for Light Magic (which had included a smoking area, that was relocated under the Monorail track between the Matterhorn Bobsleds and Autopia before it was removed in 2019) to decrease overwhelming crowds gathered for viewing the fireworks spectacular in Plaza and Main Street.

Other changes (1966–2008)
When the ride was moved to Disneyland in 1966, a scene representing Oceania was added to the ride, which was not included at the World's Fair due to time and budget constraints. At the same time, hello and goodbye rooms were added to the attraction, which have also seen several changes over the years. In the 1960s–'70s there were stylized cutouts of flowers saying hello and goodbye in different languages, these were then changed to stylized rainbows with cutout butterflies in the 1980s–'90s, before changing to a nautical theme with stylized boats with different greetings at the turn of the millennium. When Bank of America sponsored the ride, there was also a message in the goodbye room that read:
Wherever you go
Around the World
You're never far
From Bank of America. The finale scene also received changes, as originally the color palette was white with colored pastels, such as pink, yellow, and light blue, and in the early 1980s this would be changed to a darker color palette of black, as well as purple and blue. There also used to be a large stylized sun at the end of the finale scene, which would be removed circa 1990 for unknown reasons. In addition, many other scenes also saw subtle changes through the years.

2008 refurbishment
Disneyland's "It's a Small World" was closed from January to November 2008 (closed and reopening in holiday version, skipping the summer season) to receive a major refurbishment. The building's structure was improved, permanent attachments created for the "It's a Small World Holiday" overlay, the water flume replaced and its propulsion upgraded to electric water jet turbines, and the attraction's aging fiberglass boats redesigned in durable plastic. The refurbishment added 29 new Disney characters, each in their native land in a similar manner to the Hong Kong Disneyland version. The refurbishment also restored the original white and pastel colors in the finale, as well as the farewell sun and tapestry, the latter of which hadn't been seen since the 1964-65 World's Fair.

Osram Sylvania has agreed to a twelve-year sponsorship. In 2014, the sponsor logo at the attraction's entrance changed to that of Siemens AG, the parent company of Sylvania. The sponsorship ended its run after the 2017 Christmas season.

The Magic, the Memories and You

As part of Disney's "Let the Memories Begin" campaign for 2011, a nighttime projection show premiered at Disneyland's It's a Small World in Anaheim on January 27, 2011. The Magic, the Memories and You show projected sequences of Disney attractions and characters set to Disney music onto the exterior façade of It's a Small World to fill its architectural features, personalized with exclusive photographs and videos of park guests taken that day by Disney's PhotoPass cast members. The show also existed in Walt Disney World's Magic Kingdom, but was projected onto Cinderella Castle. As the "Let the Memories Begin" campaign drew to a close, the show ended its run on Labor Day, September 3, 2012, at both locations. The Florida version was eventually replaced by Celebrate the Magic in fall 2012 and later by Once Upon a Time in 2016. The Magic, The Memories and You theme song later rewritten for Celebrate! Tokyo Disneyland as part of the Tokyo Disney Resort 35th Anniversary celebration that premiered at Tokyo Disneyland on July 10, 2018, which also created as nod and tribute for the former nighttime projection show.

Magic Kingdom
On October 1, 1971, a version of the ride opened in Florida's Walt Disney World Fantasyland within Magic Kingdom. The boarding queue was built inside the Enchanted Hall (which is a alleyway that transitions from Fantasyland to Liberty Square), and the three-dimensional facade that is seen outdoors in the other Disney parks was instead located in a slightly smaller scale along the far wall. The clock lacks the parade of wooden dolls and instead goes straight to opening the central pair of doors to reveal the time. The company Kodak sponsored the attraction for an unknown period of time in the early 1980s, before the toy company Mattel sponsored the attraction from 1991 until 1998, when it transferred its sponsorship to another Magic Kingdom attraction, Buzz Lightyear's Space Ranger Spin in nearby Tomorrowland from that attraction's opening in 1998 until 1999, when it also dropped its sponsorship of that attraction, thus ending Mattel's history as a Walt Disney World sponsor. In 2005, the attraction's load area was redesigned to feature an indoor version of the facade and clock tower based on the attraction's Disneyland counterpart. In 2021, for the parks 50th anniversary, its facade was repainted in bright colors.

Tokyo Disneyland

The Tokyo Disneyland version of the attraction is identical in layout to the Magic Kingdom version except for these differences:
 The façade's design is an almost-complete replica of the California counterpart under a different color scheme, resembling Disneyland's 1990s version.
 The loading area is split into two zones instead of one.
 A Welcome room was added during the 2018 refurbishment, resembling the one at the California version.
 There are scenes featuring various Disney characters redesigned in Mary Blair's style that were added during the 2018 refurbishment.
 The Asian room features radically different sets and dolls for Japan and China compared to the Magic Kingdom version. A Mandarin-language track was added to the China section in the 2018 refurbishment.
 The ride uses a different, more recent recording of the song sung in Japanese specifically created for this version instead of the original Japanese recording. The vocal track is used for both the Asian room and finale room.
 The walls of the African, South American, and Oceanian rooms are painted in colors similar to the Magic Kingdom version before its 2005 renovation.
 The Polynesian room has vocals singing in English.
 The Goodbye room resembles the one found at the California version.

2018 refurbishment
On March 1, 2017, Tokyo Disneyland's version of "It's a Small World" closed down for refurbishment for its first major update since the park's opening in 1983. Reopened on April 8, 2018 coinciding with Tokyo Disneyland's 35th anniversary, the attraction featured 40 characters from Disney properties including Cinderella, Alice in Wonderland, Peter Pan, The Aristocats, Brave, The Little Mermaid, Aladdin, Pinocchio, The Jungle Book, The Lion King, Hercules, The Three Caballeros, Mulan, Tangled, Lilo & Stitch, Frozen, Finding Nemo, and Moana similar to its counterparts in California and Hong Kong.

The attraction was initially set to be relocated to another area in Fantasyland with a new facade similar to the California counterpart as part of original expansion plans announced in October 2014 for the resort within the next ten years before being revised and updated. The updated version of the attraction soft-opened on April 8, 2018, revealing a redone color scheme for the façade, a new tick-tock sound and parade music (similar to the ones used in Hong Kong and Anaheim), an entirely redone loading area dubbed “Small World Station,” a new Welcome room, an extended Goodbye room, redone set pieces, and music tracks new to the ride including a Mandarin language track added to the China scene formerly exclusive to the Hong Kong version along with the aforementioned Disney characters.

Disneyland Paris
The attraction at Disneyland Paris is a departure from other versions of the attraction. The façade features rearranged and slightly redesigned landmarks with a completely different clock tower. The exterior clock face features a wide-awake sun on its left half and a sleeping moon on its right half. Unlike all other versions of the ride, every scene is housed in one room with arches being used to define sections of the ride. The scenery design is a complete departure from Mary Blair's distinctive style, though the dolls used remain identical to all other versions. The ride also uses a completely different soundtrack composed by John Debney (which was also used for roughly a decade at the Californian version from 1992 to 2002, before switching back to the original 1966 soundtrack), which can be described as more ornate compared to the original soundtrack. This is the first version of the ride to incorporate a scene for North America with dolls representing Canada and the United States, and a distinct Middle Eastern section with dolls singing in Arabic and Hebrew.  In the Finale room, in addition to the song being sung in English, it is also sung in Dutch French German and Russian. Also, the attraction had a post-show area called World Chorus that was sponsored by Orange S.A., which opened with the park in 1992 and then closed in 2010 to make way for the Princess Pavilion meet and greet area.

2015 refurbishment
As part of an ongoing plan to refurbish several attractions for the park's 25th anniversary, this version went under an extensive refurbishment for six months before it reopened on December 19, 2015. The refurbishment included a different color scheme for the façade that is identical to the color scheme when it first opened, restored assets and special effects, refurbished boats, new LED lighting to replace the old stage lighting, and all 176 dolls in the ride being progressively replaced through 2017. The entrance and exit rooms have been completely revamped, being identical to the entrance scene in Hong Kong Disneyland's version and the exit scene in the Magic Kingdom and Hong Kong Disneyland versions (rendered in the Mary Blair style similar to the other parks). The soundtrack has been completely remastered with the base instrumental removed from the majority of the ride's audio except for the finale, making the soundtrack more similar to the original version. Additionally, new audio tracks are added including a new recording of someone yodeling to the tune of the song in the Switzerland scene.

2021-2023 refurbishment 
Disneyland Paris’ "It’s a Small World" was closed from November 29, 2021 until Autumn 2022. It reopened Spring 2023. Now, as the construction continues on this classic attraction, construction walls have gone up around the building.

Hong Kong Disneyland

The Hong Kong Disneyland version of the attraction is mostly modeled after the original Disneyland counterpart, using a canal for the boats to travel through instead of the open-ended water track found in the Magic Kingdom, Tokyo, and Paris versions. Some of this version's prominent and unique characteristics include:
 38 Disney characters (all rendered in the Mary Blair style) added to scenes where their stories originated This plan was originally supposed for the Magic Kingdom version of the attraction.
 An expanded Asia sequence with Hong Kong, the Philippines and Korea represented with children singing in Cantonese, Tagalog and Korean, respectively, as well as an extended China scene with represented with children singing in Mandarin 
 A distinct Arabian room, and scenes for North America, similar to the Paris version
 Extraordinary fiber-optic lighting effects in the Finale room not seen on any other Disney attraction
 Cantonese, Korean, Mandarin, and Tagalog versions of the song that were specifically recorded for Hong Kong Disneyland. The finale is sung in three languages: Cantonese, English and Mandarin.

The attraction is the largest indoor attraction at Hong Kong Disneyland. It is situated beyond the Hong Kong Disneyland Railroad, next to Disney's Storybook Theater where Mickey and the Wondrous Book is performed daily.

Holiday overlay
Since 1997, Disneyland has featured "It's a Small World Holiday" during the end-of-the-year Christmas and holiday season. The attraction is closed in late October to receive temporary holiday decorations inside and outside and reopens in early November before the start of the busy holiday tourist season. After the holiday season, "It's a Small World Holiday" stays open until late January where it closes to remove the holiday overlay and return to classic "It's a Small World" in early February. Almost one million lights are included during the holidays. The overlay has proved very popular and has led to the installation of Fastpass machines. The attraction is the same boat voyage through many regions of the world, though the main theme song is not played in full.  Instead, the children sing "Jingle Bells" and a bridge of "Deck the Halls" in addition to the main theme. Other versions of this overlay have been implemented at different international versions of the ride since. Since the holiday 2009 season, the Disney characters and The Spirit of America room (formerly the covered transition room) have joined in the "It's a Small World Holiday" at Disneyland. During the 2019 holiday season, Disney Imagineering added 3 new scents on "It's a Small World" Holiday. Since 1997, the European room has implemented a peppermint gingerbread scent, now accompanied by 3 new scents such as cherry blossoms in Asia, cinnamon in South America, and coconuts in the South Seas. For the 2020–2021 season, the overlay didn't take place due to COVID-19 and the ongoing closure of Disneyland Park.

Prior to the 2018 refurbishment, Tokyo Disneyland had a version of "It's a Small World Holiday" called "It's a Small World Very Merry Holidays".

Disneyland Paris had a version of the overlay in which the full holiday soundtrack was not used. For the 2009 winter season, it received an overhaul with an official name of "It's a Small World Celebration". The overhaul included new lighting and decorations throughout the ride, and the entire ride now uses the full "It's a Small World Holiday" soundtrack. Following a 2015 renovation, "It's a Small World Celebration" was planned to use an updated soundtrack originally set for winter 2016. However, it was delayed for unknown reasons. “It's a Small World Celebration” returned for the 2017–2018 holiday season, featuring an updated soundtrack.

Hong Kong Disneyland implemented its own version called "It's a Small World Christmas" that highlights the Disney character scenes in Christmas fashion with an appearance of Santa Claus in the North Pole scene.

The Magic Kingdom does not have its own holiday edition of "It's a Small World", and the regular ride operates continuously through the holiday season.

Television series and cancelled film
 On November 26, 2013, Disney released It's a Small World: The Animated Series on Disney.com as an online-exclusive series, and the final episode was released on February 4, 2014.

 On April 22, 2014, it was announced that a feature film franchise about the ride was in the works, to be directed by Jon Turteltaub, written by Jared Stern, and produced by Turteltaub, Stern, and Dan Lin. By the late 2010's, no new information of the film had been released, and the project is presumably cancelled.

Accidental Deaths on It's A Small World
 On October 6, 2010, a Disneyland Paris staff member died on It's A Small World as the ride was turned back on when the staff member was cleaning. According to police, the amusement park ride accidentally turned on while the 53-year-old man was cleaning the ride due to an accident with a child guest. The 53-year-old man, a sub-contractor of the park was reportedly trapped beneath a boat on the ride when it was turned on. The unnamed man was severely injured and was transported by helicopter to a near by hospital where he later died of his injuries.
 It's A Small World had been closed until further notice while police investigated the issues revolving the accidental death of their employee.

See also
 List of Disneyland attractions
 List of Magic Kingdom attractions
 List of Tokyo Disneyland attractions
 List of Disneyland Park (Paris) attractions
 List of Hong Kong Disneyland attractions
 Incidents at Disneyland Resort
 Incidents at Walt Disney World
 Incidents at Disneyland Paris
 List of Disney attractions using Audio-Animatronics

References

External links
 Disneyland – It's a Small World
 Walt Disney World Resort – It's a Small World
 Tokyo Disneyland – It's a Small World
 Disneyland Park (Paris) – It's a Small World
 Hong Kong Disneyland – It's a Small World
 

1964 New York World's Fair
Amusement rides introduced in 1966
Amusement rides introduced in 1971
Amusement rides introduced in 1983
Amusement rides introduced in 1992
Amusement rides introduced in 2008
Audio-Animatronic attractions
Dark rides
Disneyland Park (Paris)
Disneyland
Fantasyland
Hong Kong Disneyland
Magic Kingdom
Tokyo Disneyland
Walt Disney Parks and Resorts attractions
Walt Disney Parks and Resorts gentle boat rides
Water rides manufactured by Arrow Dynamics
World's fair music
1966 establishments in California
1971 establishments in Florida
1983 establishments in Japan
1992 establishments in France
2008 establishments in Hong Kong
Folk costumes
1966 songs